The 2012 Philadelphia Union season is the third season of the team's existence, competing in Major League Soccer, the top flight of American soccer. The team was initially managed by former MLS player Peter Nowak, in his third season with the club. In June, Nowak resigned and assistant coach John Hackworth was promoted to manager on an interim basis. Hackworth was officially made permanent head coach in August, making him the second head coach in the club's history.

2012 roster
As of August 28, 2012.

Match results

Preseason friendlies

MLS regular season

The Union finished 10-18-6 overall, 7-8-2 at home, 3-10-4 on the road.

U.S. Open Cup

Friendlies

MLS Reserve League 

The Union Reserves are 4-4-2 overall, 3-1-1 at home, 1-3-1 on the road.

League table

Conference

Overall

Results summary

Coaching staff

Squad information

Squad breakdown

Ages are as of April 16, 2012 (the date of their season opener).

Statistics

Statistics are from all MLS league matches.

* = Not currently part of team.

Goalkeepers

* = Not currently part of team.

Honors and awards

MLS Goal of the Week

MLS Team of the Week

MLS All-Stars 2012

Player movement

Transfers

In

Out

Loans

In

Out

Miscellany

Allocation ranking 
Philadelphia came into the 2012 season thirteenth in the MLS Allocation Ranking. The allocation ranking is the mechanism used to determine which MLS club has first priority to acquire a U.S. National Team player who signs with MLS after playing abroad, or a former MLS player who returns to the league after having gone to a club abroad for a transfer fee. A ranking can be traded, provided that part of the compensation received in return is another club's ranking.

On June 25, the Union traded their position in the allocation ranking plus allocation money and their first round pick in the 2013 MLS SuperDraft to Vancouver Whitecaps FC for the top position in the allocation rankings and a second round pick in the 2013 Draft.  The Union then used the Allocation ranking to sign Bakary Soumaré.

International roster slots 

The Union have nine MLS International Roster Slots for use in the 2012 season. Each club in Major League Soccer is allocated eight international roster spots per season, but the Union acquired a ninth from Los Angeles in exchange for Kyle Nakazawa.  This ninth slot would eventually be traded to D.C. United along with Lionard Pajoy for Danny Cruz and reverts to the Galaxy at the end of 2012.

NOTES:

 Bakary Soumaré was born in Mali but is not considered an international player as he is a permanent resident of the US.
 Freddy Adu, Antoine Hoppenot, and Michael Lahoud were born in Ghana, France and Sierra Leone, respectively, but are all American citizens.

Future draft pick trades 
Future picks acquired: *2013 MLS SuperDraft second round pick (natural selection) from FC Dallas for Andrew Jacobson. 
Future picks traded: *2013 MLS SuperDraft second round pick (natural selection) and Kyle Nakazawa to Los Angeles Galaxy for an international roster slot.
Future picks swapped: *2013 MLS SuperDraft first round pick, allocation money, and the twelfth position in the MLS Allocation Order to Vancouver Whitecaps FC for a 2013 SuperDraft second round pick and the first position in the Allocation Order.

References

External links
 Philadelphia Union website

2012
American soccer clubs 2012 season
2012 in sports in Pennsylvania